The 2004 Louisiana–Monroe Indians football team represented the University of Louisiana at Monroe in the 2004 NCAA Division I-A college football season. The Indians offense scored 211 points while the defense allowed 303 points.

Schedule

Coaching staff

References

Louisiana–Monroe
Louisiana–Monroe Warhawks football seasons
Louisiana–Monroe Indians football